Dicraspidia is a monotypic genus of flowering plants belonging to the family Muntingiaceae. The only species is Dicraspidia donnell-smithii.

Its native range is Central America.

References

Muntingiaceae
Monotypic Malvales genera